Dragon Ball Z: Broly – Second Coming, known in Japan as  or by Toei's own English title Dragon Ball Z: Dangerous Rivals, is a 1994 Japanese anime science fiction martial arts film and the tenth Dragon Ball Z feature film. It was released in Japan on March 12 at the Toei Anime Fair alongside Dr. Slump and Arale-chan: Hoyoyo!! Follow the Rescued Shark... and the first Slam Dunk film. It is the sequel to Dragon Ball Z: Broly – The Legendary Super Saiyan. The second sequel is Dragon Ball Z: Bio-Broly.

Plot

Following his defeat, Broly emerges from a space pod that crashed on Earth after he escaped the comet that destroyed New Vegeta. He slips into unconsciousness as he repeats the name "Kakarot" and is frozen within the crater.

Seven years later, Goten, Trunks, and Videl search for the magical Dragon Balls and encounter a village being terrorized by a supposed monster and a dubious shaman who demands human sacrifice to appease it. They devise a plan to rescue the village by baiting the monster but when Goten inadvertently causes an obstruction, Videl slaps him and he begins to cry. The monster, revealed to be a dinosaur, is drawn out and killed by Goten and Trunks. With the village now safe and the shaman exiled, the group departs to continue their Dragon Ball hunt. Unbeknownst to them, Goten's cries awaken Broly. As night falls the group rests after collecting six of the seven Dragon Balls when a loud eruption occurs and Videl takes off to investigate. She soon encounters Broly and fights him but he effortlessly dispatches her and she is left unconscious when Goten and Trunks arrive. They battle Broly but they are no match for the brute and they flee in fear. Gohan saves them as they attempt to gather the Dragon Balls to wish Broly away. Gohan is no match for Broly who directs a lethal sphere of energy towards Videl, Trunks and Goten. In distress, Gohan races towards them and attempts to deflect it and manages to shield them from the blast but the ensuing explosion renders them all unconscious.

Gohan assumes his Super Saiyan form in an effort to defeat Broly who transforms into his Legendary Super Saiyan form. Gohan successfully lures Broly into a pit of lava which consumes him and Gohan passes out from exhaustion before being rescued by Krillin. Moments later, Broly re-emerges and attacks Gohan after incapacitating Krillin. Gohan is powerless as he is crushed by Broly's bear hug until Videl arrives and unsuccessfully attempts to intervene. Heartened by Videl's effort, Gohan frees himself from Broly's grip and fires a Kamehameha wave at Broly. The Legendary Super Saiyan hurls a gigantic sphere of energy at Gohan which collides with the Kamehameha. Goten joins his brother in the energy struggle but Broly's sphere absorbs their waves and pushes further towards them. Goten wishes their father was there to help them and miraculously the Dragon Balls grant his desperate wish as the sky darkens and Goku appears much to their surprise and Broly's confusion. Goku joins his sons and fires a Kamehameha wave, however their combined effort remains futile as Broly continues to resist until he is distracted by Trunks who fires a blast at him. The family of Super Saiyans unleash a final push propelling the Kamehameha wave which directly pushes Broly into space and he dies when he collides with the sun. Gohan and Goten question if their father was ever there at all and are soon joined by Trunks, Krillin and Videl as they celebrate their victory.

Cast

Music
The song "We Gotta Power" was used as the film's opening theme.

Kiseki no Big Fight

 is the closing theme song of the film. It is a single by Japanese singer Hironobu Kageyama. It was released on 8 cm cd on March 21, 1994 in Japan only. It is coupled with an image song "Dragon Ball no Densetsu" performed by Shin Oya. The single charted at 89 on Oricon.

Track list:
奇蹟のビッグ・ファイトKiseki no Biggu Faito/The Miraculous Big Fight
ドラゴンボールの伝説Doragon Bōru no Densetsu/Legend of the Dragon Balls

English dub soundtrack
The following songs were present in the Funimation dub of Broly: Second Coming. The remaining music featured in the background was composed by Nathan Johnson, but I.O.N made exclusive songs for the film:

 I.O.N. - Set Me Free
 I.O.N. - Ignored
 I.O.N. - Why
 I.O.N. - Deeper
 I.O.N. - Unaccepted

The score for the English dub's composed by Nathan Johnson. The Triple Feature release contains an alternate audio track containing the English dub with original Japanese background music by Shunsuke Kikuchi, an opening theme of "We Gotta Power", and an ending theme of "Kiseki no Big Fight".

Box office
At the Japanese box office, the film sold  tickets and grossed .

Releases
It was released on DVD and VHS in North America on April 5, 2005. Plus, it was released it in a bundle along with Broly – The Legendary Super Saiyan (1993) for Blu-ray on November 13, 2007, both feature full 1080p format in HD remastered 16:9 aspect ratio and an enhanced 5.1 surround mix. It was later remastered and released in Triple Feature set with the original Broly films and Bio-Broly (1994) for Blu-ray and DVD on March 31, 2009. The film was re-released to DVD in final remastered thinpak collection on January 3, 2012, containing the last 4 Dragon Ball Z films.

Reception

Other companies
A second English version, produced and released exclusively in Malaysia by Speedy Video, features an unknown cast.

A third English dub produced and released by Solar Entertainment in the Philippines, also features an unknown cast.

References

External links
 Official anime website of Toei Animation
 
 

1994 anime films
Broly Second Coming
Funimation
Toei Animation films
Films scored by Shunsuke Kikuchi
Films directed by Shigeyasu Yamauchi
Anime and manga about revenge